The 2012–13 SC Freiburg season is the 109th season in the club's football history. In 2012–13 the club plays in the Bundesliga, the top tier of German football. It is the club's fourth consecutive season in this league, having been promoted from the 2. Bundesliga at the conclusion of the 2008–09 season.

The club also takes part in the 2012–13 edition of the DFB-Pokal, the German Cup, where it reached the semi-final stage after defeating fellow Bundesliga side Mainz 05 1–2 after extra time on 26 February 2013. They then lost to VfB Stuttgart 2–1 in Stuttgart. They also qualified for the Group Stage of the 2013–14 UEFA Europa League.

Review and events

Matches

Legend

Friendly matches

Bundesliga

League table

Matches

DFB-Pokal

Squad information

Squad and statistics

|-
! colspan="12" style="background:#dcdcdc; text-align:center;"| Goalkeepers

|-
! colspan="12" style="background:#dcdcdc; text-align:center;"| Defenders

|-
! colspan="12" style="background:#dcdcdc; text-align:center;"| Midfielders

|-
! colspan="12" style="background:#dcdcdc; text-align:center;"| Strikers

|}

Transfers

In

Out

Kits

Sources

External links
 2012–13 SC Freiburg season at Weltfussball.de 
 2012–13 SC Freiburg season at kicker.de 
 2012–13 SC Freiburg season at Fussballdaten.de 

Freiburg
SC Freiburg seasons